Kotokel is a rural locality (a settlement) in Pribaykalsky District, Republic of Buryatia, Russia. The population was 145 as of 2010. There is 1 street.

Geography

References 

Rural localities in Okinsky District